Burjassot Club de Futbol is a Spanish football team based in Burjassot, in the autonomous community of Valencia. Founded in 1913 as Club Verano Burjassot, it plays in Regional Preferente – Group 2, holding home games at Estadio Los Silos, a stadium with a capacity of 2,000 seats.

History 
In 1916 the club was registered in the Valencian Football Federation.

Season to season

1 season in Segunda División
20 seasons in Tercera División

Notable former players
 Sergio Hinestrosa
 Ángel Amarilla
 Fernando Marzal
 Míchel
 David Rangel
 Vicente Romero
 Vicente Asensi

References

External links
Official website 
Futbolme.com profile 

Football clubs in the Valencian Community
Association football clubs established in 1913
Divisiones Regionales de Fútbol clubs
1913 establishments in Spain
Segunda División clubs